Theron Magnus Wood (born 7 February 1990) is a Caymanian footballer who plays as a forward for Bodden Town and the Cayman Islands national team.

He represented the Cayman Islands at the 2010 Caribbean Championship and in World Cup qualifying matches in 2011.

Club career
Wood was one of a group of Caymanian players identified by the country's football federation who they believed would benefit from playing overseas. He joined Ashford Town (Middlesex) in England after being invited over in late 2010 on an initial short term basis, although the move was extended then until the end of the season. He made his first-team debut for the club in late January 2012 going on to make a total of 13 appearances.

He returned to England in March 2012 joining Evesham Town on trial, playing one league game for the club.

Career statistics

Scores and results list Cayman Islands' goal tally first, score column indicates score after each Wood goal.

References

1990 births
Living people
Association football forwards
Caymanian footballers
Caymanian expatriate footballers
Expatriate footballers in England
Caymanian expatriate sportspeople in England
Bodden Town F.C. players
Ashford Town (Middlesex) F.C. players
Evesham United F.C. players
Cayman Islands Premier League players
Southern Football League players
Cayman Islands international footballers
Cayman Islands under-20 international footballers
Cayman Islands youth international footballers